Aaiyat    is a town in Akkar Governorate, Lebanon.

The population  is mostly Sunni Muslim.

History
In 1838, Eli Smith noted  the place as 'Ayat,  located east of esh-Sheikh Mohammed. The  inhabitants were Sunni Muslim.

References

Bibliography

External links
 Aaiyat, Localiban 

Populated places in Akkar District
Sunni Muslim communities in Lebanon